Mark Lincoln Morgan is an Australian former swimmer who primarily competed in freestyle events.

Morgan was the Commonwealth champion in the 100 metres freestyle at the 1978 Commonwealth Games in Edmonton, with a time of 52.70 seconds, to finish ahead of Canadians Bill Sawchuk and Gary MacDonald. He won a further four medals in Edmonton, including gold in the 4 × 200 m freestyle relay and a bronze in the 200m freestyle.

Named in the Australian team for the 1980 Moscow Olympics, Morgan opted to join the boycott and announced his withdrawal in late May, two months before the event was due to begin. He wrote a letter to the Australian Olympic Federation explaining his stance, citing Russia's foreign policy and concern that an athlete's presence at the games would be used as propaganda, amongst his reasons for not going to Moscow.

References

External links
Mark Morgan at Commonwealth Games Federation

Year of birth missing (living people)
Living people
Australian male freestyle swimmers
Swimmers at the 1978 Commonwealth Games
Commonwealth Games medallists in swimming
Commonwealth Games gold medallists for Australia
Commonwealth Games silver medallists for Australia
Commonwealth Games bronze medallists for Australia
20th-century Australian people
Medallists at the 1978 Commonwealth Games